Sharon Angela is an American film and television actress, screenwriter, and film director. Angela is known for her portrayal of Rosalie Aprile on the HBO series The Sopranos.

Biography 
Angela has appeared in several films such as Cabaret Maxinef, The Hungry Ghosts, Ghost Dog: The Way of the Samurai, On the Run, and Two Family House. Her television credits include guest appearances on Law & Order and Law & Order: Criminal Intent. During the sixth season of The Sopranos, Angela was elevated from guest star to series regular for her character Rosalie Aprile, the widow of Jackie Aprile Sr., and is also a close friend of Carmela Soprano.

She co-wrote the 2005 film, The Collection and co-directed the 2007 film, Made in Brooklyn. She also voiced Angie Pegorino in the 2008 video game Grand Theft Auto IV.

Filmography

Film

Television

Other

As writer

As director

References

External links

American television actresses
Living people
American film actresses
Place of birth missing (living people)
American women film directors
20th-century American actresses
21st-century American actresses
American women screenwriters
1963 births